Zelyony is a rural locality (a village) in Burnovsky Selsoviet, Birsky District, Bashkortostan, Russia. The population was 278 as of 2010. There are 3 streets.

Geography 
Zelyony is located 18 km northeast of Birsk (the district's administrative centre) by road. Yangitau and Bazhenovo are the nearest rural localities.

References 

Rural localities in Birsky District